Fabian Serrarens (born 9 February 1991) is a Dutch professional footballer who plays as a striker for Finnish club HJK. He formerly played for Arka Gdynia, De Graafschap, Telstar, Almere City FC and Roda JC Kerkrade.

Club career
On 6 January 2022, he signed a one-year contract with HJK in Finland.

References

External links
 
 Voetbal International profile 

1991 births
Living people
Association football forwards
Dutch footballers
Dutch expatriate footballers
Almere City FC players
SC Telstar players
De Graafschap players
Arka Gdynia players
Roda JC Kerkrade players
Eredivisie players
Eerste Divisie players
Ekstraklasa players
Footballers from Amsterdam
Expatriate footballers in Poland
Dutch expatriate sportspeople in Poland
FC Utrecht players
A.V.V. Zeeburgia players
AFC Ajax players
NAC Breda players
Helsingin Jalkapalloklubi players
Expatriate footballers in Finland
Dutch expatriate sportspeople in Finland